Anisa Raquel Guajardo Braff (born 10 March 1991) is an American-born Mexican professional footballer who plays as a forward for Liga MX Femenil side Club Universidad Nacional and the Mexico national team.

Early life
Guajardo was born in Fresno, California to parents Ellen Braff-Guajardo and Santiago Guajardo. She has one sister named Milena.

Guajardo attended Buchanan High School in Clovis, California. As a four-year varsity midfielder/forward, she scored 54 career goals and provided 20 assists. She was awarded an All-American honorable mention selection by ESPN RISE after her senior year. During her time at Buchanan, she helped lead the school to four consecutive CIF Central Section championships and three Tri-River Athletic Conference (TRAC) titles. In 2009, the team reached the finals of the CIF Southern California Regional Division I tournament, in addition to receiving a No. 6 national ranking and No. 2 ranking in California. In 2008, she was named a member of the ESPY Team of the Year.

She played for East Fresno United Fusion from 2006 to 2012 and helped the team reach the 2008 State Cup semi-finals.

She also competed for Stanford Club from 2001 to 2003 and California Odyssey from 2003 to 2006 serving as team captain on both teams.

Pepperdine University
Guajardo attended Pepperdine University where she majored in psychology with a minor in sports medicine. Ranks fourth in Pepperdine history with 27 career goals; ranks fifth in total points with 68; ranks fourth in career game-winning goals with nine.

Club career

Pali Blues
Guajardo played for the Pali Blues from 2011 to 2012. In May 2011, she was named to the W-League Team of the Week.

Boston Breakers
In January 2013, Guajardo was included in a list of 55 players from the U.S., Canada, and Mexico national teams that were allocated to the eight teams in the new National Women's Soccer League. She was allocated to the Boston Breakers but, after not playing in 2013, the FMF dropped her allocation.

Houston Dash
In early 2014, Guajardo was a trialist for the Houston Dash, also of the NWSL. She was brought in as a substitute during two preseason games, but was ultimately not signed by the club.

Australia
In May 2015, Guajardo flew to Australia and joined Heidelberg United. She scored 3 goals in the 4 games she played for the club. In October 2015, Guajardo joined W-League club Melbourne City for their inaugural season in the 2015–16 W-League season. In November 2016, it was announced she was released by the club.

Valur
On 4 February 2017, Icelandic side Valur announced Guajardo as one of their signings for that year's season.

Sundsvalls DFF
In February 2018, Guajardo signed with Sundsvalls DFF of the Damallsvenskan.

International career
Guajardo competed with the U-17 Mexican Women's National Team at the CONCACAF U-17 Championship in Trinidad & Tobago in July 2008. In August 2008 she joined the U-20 Mexican Women's National Team. Her first senior Mexican Women's National Team call up was in November 2011 and she received her first cap on 20 November 2011 versus France. On 22 January 2012 during the CONCACAF Women's Olympic Qualifying Tournament she earned a hat trick against the Dominican Republic. Guajardo participated in the 2013 Algarve Cup.

References

External links
 
 
 
 
 
 
 
 
 

1991 births
Living people
Citizens of Mexico through descent
Mexican women's footballers
Women's association football forwards
Mexico women's international footballers
2015 FIFA Women's World Cup players
Mexican people of American descent
A-League Women players
Melbourne City FC (A-League Women) players
Anisa Guajardo
Anisa Guajardo
Liga MX Femenil players
Club Universidad Nacional (women) footballers
Mexican expatriate women's footballers
Mexican expatriate sportspeople in Australia
Expatriate women's soccer players in Australia
Mexican expatriate sportspeople in Iceland
Expatriate women's footballers in Iceland
Mexican expatriate sportspeople in Sweden
Expatriate women's footballers in Sweden
American women's soccer players
Soccer players from California
People from Fresno, California
American sportspeople of Mexican descent

Pepperdine Waves women's soccer players
Boston Breakers players
American expatriate women's soccer players
American expatriate sportspeople in Australia
American expatriate sportspeople in Iceland
American expatriate sportspeople in Sweden
Sundsvalls DFF players
Elitettan players